The 1998 FEI World Equestrian Games were held in Rome, Italy from October 1 to October 11, 1998. They were the 3rd edition of the games which are held every four years and run by the FEI.

Events
11 events in 5 disciplines were held in Rome.

Medal summary

Medalists

Medal count

External links

FEI World Equestrian Games
FEI World Equestrian Games
Sports competitions in Rome
E
1998 in equestrian
Equestrian sports competitions in Italy
October 1998 sports events in Europe
1990s in Rome
Horse driving competition